Andrey Likhavitski (born June 23, 1986) is a Belarusian male artistic gymnast and a member of the national team. He participated at the 2013, 2014, 2015 World Artistic Gymnastics Championships, and qualified for the 2016 Summer Olympics where he finished in 18th place in the men's artistic individual all-around event.

References

External links 
 

1986 births
Living people
Belarusian male artistic gymnasts
Olympic gymnasts of Belarus
Gymnasts at the 2016 Summer Olympics
Gymnasts from Minsk
Sportspeople from Samara, Russia
Gymnasts at the 2015 European Games
Gymnasts at the 2019 European Games
European Games medalists in gymnastics
European Games bronze medalists for Belarus
21st-century Belarusian people